Nassir Ghaemi (born 1966) is an academic psychiatrist, author, and Professor of Psychiatry at Tufts University School of Medicine in Boston. He has written several books on mental illness and mood disorders, and has contributed to many scientific journals and other published works.

Life
He immigrated to the United States at the age of 5 from Tehran, Iran and attended McLean High School in McLean, Virginia. He received his B.A. from George Mason University in 1986, and later a medical degree from Medical College of Virginia. He then went on to get an MA in philosophy from Tufts University in 2001, and a MPH from the Harvard School of Public Health in 2004.

Works 
 On Depression: Drugs, Diagnosis, and Despair in the Modern World
 A First-Rate Madness
 The Rise and Fall of the Biopsychosocial Model: Reconciling Art and Science in Psychiatry
 The Concepts of Psychiatry: A Pluralistic Approach to the Mind and Mental Illness
 A Clinician's Guide to Statistics and Epidemiology in Mental Health: Measuring Truth and Uncertainty
 Mood Disorders: A Practical Guide, Second Edition

References 

Living people
Harvard School of Public Health alumni
George Mason University alumni
Medical College of Virginia alumni
Tufts University School of Arts and Sciences alumni
1966 births
Iranian psychiatrists
American psychiatrists